The Opel Meriva is a car manufactured and marketed by the German automaker Opel on its Corsa platform, from May 2003 until June 2017 across two generations. Described as a mini MPV, it was marketed as the Vauxhall Meriva in the United Kingdom, while in Latin America, the first generation model was marketed as the Chevrolet Meriva.


First generation (2003)

The first generation, named the Meriva A, was based on the third generation Opel Corsa C. It went on sale in May 2003. The first official pictures of the Meriva were released in August 2002. It has been described as a mini MPV, a supermini-MPV, a small people carrier, and an estate car.

Like its larger counterpart, the Zafira, the Meriva had a flexible interior, marketed as FlexSpace. Although it only had five seats divided into two rows, the second row could slide forward or backward, or be flattened into the floor, making a flat, level platform for increased boot space. The second row could accommodate two or three passengers.

In the two passenger mode, the seats were separated from the doors and from each other much like the front seats. In three passenger mode, the back seat looked like a regular one piece seat. The front seat could be pushed fully backwards.

The Meriva was sold in South America (except in Chile) from 2003 through 2012 (2013 in Argentina) as the Chevrolet Meriva, where it was replaced in 2012 by the Chevrolet Spin. The initial version had been co-developed by Opel and General Motors do Brasil. It was built in São José dos Campos, Brazil.

Engines

Initial launch
From launch, there were three petrol engines and one diesel engine. In 2005, the 1.6 8v petrol engine was replaced with a more powerful and efficient 1.4 engine. The 1.6 Turbo was available with a six speed manual gearbox as standard, and the other engines had a five speed manual gearbox as standard. The 1.6 (16v) and 1.8 petrols were available with a five speed 'Easytronic' gearbox as an option.

Petrol

1.0 
1.6 (8v), with 
1.6 (16v), with 
1.8, with 

Both 1.4 and 1.8 were available as flexfuel in Brazil.

Diesel

1.7 CDTI, with

Facelift
Petrol

1.4 TWINPORT, with 
1.6 TWINPORT 
1.8, with 

Diesel

1.3 CDTI, with 
1.7 CDTI, with 
1.7 CDTI, with

Facelift
When the Meriva was facelifted in February 2006, the front and rear ends were revised, and three new/revised engines came along as well as an extra trim level, the OPC/VXR.

Safety 
The Meriva in its standard European configuration received 4 stars for adult occupants and 1 star for pedestrians from Euro NCAP in 2003.

The Meriva in its most basic Latin American configuration with 1 airbag received 3 stars for adult occupants and 1 star for toddlers from Latin NCAP in 2010.

Second generation (2010) 

The second generation, named the Meriva B, is slightly larger in size than the previous generation. It has been described as a compact MPV, a supermini-MPV, a small people carrier, a small family car, and an estate car.

The market launch took place on 12 June 2010. The Meriva B appeared in November 2009. The new model uses revised suspension layout from the former version but with a floorpan associated with the seven seater Zafira Tourer. The interior is similar to that of the 2009 to 2015 Astra and Insignia.

The new Meriva uses front seat technology from the Insignia and Astra.

The Meriva B debuted at the 2010 Geneva Motor Show in March, and went into production in July 2010. The Meriva has rear-hinged rear doors, marketed as "FlexDoors". A panoramic sunroof is also available as standard on the top spec versions.

The Meriva B ended production in June 2017, and was replaced by an urban crossover named the Crossland X, and also a transition from MPV to SUV design, sister of the future replacement of the Citroën C3 Picasso.

Engines
From launch, the Meriva was available with five engines (three petrol, two diesel). The 1.7 diesel was only available with a six speed automatic gearbox, and the 1.4 turbo (140 PS) and 1.7 (130 hp) were only available with a six speed manual gearbox. Since September 2010, two more engines became available, both diesel, the 1.3 (95 hp) and the 1.7 (130 hp). All petrol engines are Ecotec.

From 2011, Stop/Start was added to certain engines (engines with (S/S) are bold in  column), a cleaner, more powerful 1.7 CDTI auto was added, and the petrol engines became slightly more efficient. A six speed automatic gearbox became available for the 1.4T (120) petrol engine.

In January 2014. Opel introduced newly developed engine with restyled Meriva: 1.6 CDTI engine with 95 PS, 110 PS, and 136 PS.

Safety
The Meriva in its standard European configuration received 5 stars from Euro NCAP in 2010.

Facelift
A facelifted version was presented as a world premiere at the Brussels International Motor Show in January 2014. It was also presented at the Frankfurt Motor Show in September 2013.

See also

 Opel Zafira
 Chevrolet Spin

References

External links

 New Vauxhall Meriva review

Meriva
Euro NCAP small MPVs
Latin NCAP small MPVs
Mini MPVs
Compact MPVs
Station wagons
Front-wheel-drive vehicles
Cars introduced in 2003
2010s cars